The Hare Krishna Temple is located at 243 Avenue Road, in Toronto, Ontario, Canada. The building is the former home of Avenue Road Church.

It was built in 1899 and was originally the Presbyterian Church of the Covenant.

The building was designed by Toronto architects Gordon & Helliwell.

See also 
International Society for Krishna Consciousness
A. C. Bhaktivedanta Swami Prabhupada
ISKCON
ISKCON Temple Visakhapatnam

References

Alan Brown – The Missing Plaques Page

Hindu temples in Canada
International Society for Krishna Consciousness temples
Religious buildings and structures in Toronto